The 2015 MSBL season was the 27th season of the Men's State Basketball League (SBL). The regular season began on Friday 13 March, with Perry Lakes and Kalamunda hosting East Perth and Mandurah respectively. The 2015 MSBL All-Star Game was played on 1 June at Bendat Basketball Centre – the home of basketball in Western Australia. The regular season ended on Saturday 25 July. The finals began on Friday 31 July and ended on Saturday 29 August, when the Joondalup Wolves defeated the South West Slammers in the MSBL Grand Final.

Regular season
The regular season began on Friday 13 March and ended on Saturday 25 July after 20 rounds of competition.

Standings

Finals
The finals began on Friday 31 July and ended on Saturday 29 August with the MSBL Grand Final.

Bracket

All-Star Game
The 2015 MSBL All-Star Game took place at Bendat Basketball Centre on Monday 1 June, with all proceeds going to Youth Focus to help prevent youth suicide. The contest was moved to mid-season in 2015, after being played a week after the grand final in 2014.

Rosters

Game data

Awards

Player of the Week

Statistics leaders

Regular season
 Most Valuable Player: Ray Turner (Perth Redbacks)
 Coach of the Year: Matt Parsons (Cockburn Cougars)
 Most Improved Player: Rhys Vague (East Perth Eagles)
 All-Star Five:
 PG: Tre Nichols (South West Slammers)
 SG: Jordan Swing (Lakeside Lightning)
 SF: Bennie Lewis (Geraldton Buccaneers)
 PF: Gavin Field (Cockburn Cougars)
 C: Ray Turner (Perth Redbacks)

Finals
 Grand Final MVP: Trian Iliadis (Joondalup Wolves)

References

External links
 2015 fixtures
 2015 media guide
 2015 season preview

2015
2014–15 in Australian basketball
2015–16 in Australian basketball